German submarine U-2530 was a Type XXI U-boat (one of the "Elektroboote") of Nazi Germany's Kriegsmarine, built for service in World War II. She was ordered on 6 November 1943, and was laid down on 1 October 1944 at Blohm & Voss, Hamburg, as yard number 2530. She was launched on 25 November 1944, and commissioned under the command of Kapitänleutnant Max Bokelberg on 30 December 1944.

Design
Like all Type XXI U-boats, U-2530 had a displacement of  when at the surface and  while submerged. The submarine was powered by two MAN SE supercharged six-cylinder M6V40/46KBB diesel engines each providing , two Siemens-Schuckert GU365/30 double-acting electric motors each providing , and two Siemens-Schuckert silent running GV232/28 electric motors each providing .

U-2530 was fitted with six  torpedo tubes in the bow and four  C/30 anti-aircraft guns. She could carry twenty-three torpedoes or seventeen torpedoes and twelve mines. The complement was five officers and fifty-two men.

Fate
U-2530 was sunk on 31 December 1944, by bombs, in Hamburg. The wreck was raised but sunk again on 17 January 1945 and 20 February 1945 during air raids on Dock V. She was broken up afterwards.

References

Bibliography

External links
 

Type XXI submarines
U-boats commissioned in 1944
World War II submarines of Germany
1944 ships
Ships built in Hamburg
U-boats sunk in 1945
U-boats sunk in 1944
Maritime incidents in December 1944
Maritime incidents in January 1945
Maritime incidents in February 1945